Nicolò Venier (ca. 1483 – 1530) was a Lord of Paros in 1518-1530.

He was a son of Zuan Francesco Venier, Co-Lord of Cerigo and his wife Fiorenza Sommaripa, Lady of Paros, and had a sister Cecilia, who succeeded him to the lordship of Paros.

In 1507 Venier married a woman named Zantano, by whom he had a son Andrea Venier, who died during his father's life. There are speculations that he was the biological father of Italian concubine Cecilia Venier-Baffo, who was captured and sold to slavery. Then she became Nurbanu Sultan, the wife of Sultan Selim II, and the queen mother of Sultan Murad III

References

1483 births
1530 deaths
Nicolo
Nicolo